NGC 248 is an emission nebula in the constellation Tucana. It is in the Small Magellanic Cloud. It was discovered in 1834 by the astronomer John Frederick William Herschel. NGC 248 is about 60 light-years long and 20 light-years wide
.

See also 
List of NGC objects

References

External links 
 

Tucana (constellation)
0248
Emission nebulae
18340411
Star-forming regions
Small Magellanic Cloud